Rick Lamar Farrar (February 12, 1960 – December 18, 2018) is an American politician. He served as a Democratic member for the 27th district of the Louisiana House of Representatives.

Farrar was born in Alexandria, Louisiana. Farrar attended the University of Louisiana at Monroe, where he earned a bachelor's degree in 1985. He earned a Juris Doctor at Southern University Law Center in 1991. In 1992 Farrar was elected for the 27th district of the Louisiana House of Representatives, serving until 1996. He served two further terms from 2000 to 2008. Farrar practised law at the Pineville law firm Farrar & Farrar, and at the Rapides Parish District Attorney's Office.

Farrar died in December 2018 at the Ochsner Baptist Medical Center in New Orleans, Louisiana, at the age of 58.

References 

1960 births
2018 deaths
Politicians from Alexandria, Louisiana
Democratic Party members of the Louisiana House of Representatives
20th-century American politicians
21st-century American politicians
Southern University Law Center alumni
University of Louisiana at Monroe alumni